Thomas Handcock (28 May 1654 – 1726) was an Irish politician.

He was the eldest son of William Handcock and his wife Abigail, daughter of Sir Thomas Stanley and sister of Thomas Stanley. His younger brother was Sir William Handcock, Recorder of Dublin. In 1692, Handcock entered the Irish House of Commons, representing Lanesborough until 1699.

On 5 July 1677, he married Dorothy Green, and had, by her, four sons and four daughters. His oldest son William sat also in the Parliament of Ireland.

References

1654 births
1726 deaths
Irish MPs 1692–1693
Irish MPs 1695–1699
Members of the Parliament of Ireland (pre-1801) for County Longford constituencies